Königsplatz (King's Square) is a square in Munich, Germany. Built in the style of European Neoclassicism in the 19th century, it displays the Propyläen Gate and, facing each other, the Glyptothek (archeological museum) and the Staatliche Antikensammlungen (art museum). The area around Königsplatz is home to the Kunstareal, Munich's gallery and museum quarter.

Architecture
The square was designed as part of the representative boulevard Brienner Straße by Karl von Fischer working for Crown Prince Ludwig of Bavaria and laid out by Leo von Klenze. Fischer modeled the Königsplatz on the Acropolis in Athens. The concept was classical rigor embedded in living green, and so an expression of urban ideas of Ludwig I. who wanted to see cultural life, civic ideals, Catholic Christianity, royal administration and the military all together and embedded in green.

Klenze framed the square with the Glyptothek and the Propylaea (created as memorial for the accession of Otto of Greece). The Staatliche Antikensammlungen was erected by Georg Friedrich Ziebland, on its back St. Boniface's Abbey is situated. The Glyptothek was built from 1816, the Propylaea were only completed in 1862.

The Lenbachhaus is situated at the north-west side of the square.

Königsplatz during the Third Reich

As a beautiful and monumental place, the Königplatz was used during the Third Reich as a square for the Nazi Party's mass rallies. The Brown House, the national headquarters of the Nazi Party in Germany was located at 45 Brienner Straße close to the square.

Two Honor Temples (Ehrentempel) were erected at the east side of the Königsplatz in severe neo-Greek style to echo the architecture of the older buildings; they "enshrined" the remains of the sixteen Nazis killed in the 1923 Beer Hall Putsch, who were worshipped by Nazis as martyrs.  Both temples were demolished by the US Army in 1947, although their platforms remain to this day. Two buildings of the Nazi party constructed by Paul Troost next to the temples still exist; in the one north of Brienner Strasse, the Führerbau, the Munich Agreement was signed in 1938. Today it is a school for music and theatre called the Hochschule für Musik und Theater München. The other one south of said Boulevard nowadays houses a couple of minor museal institutions within the wider context of the Kunstareal. 

Nazi book burnings occurred at Königsplatz in 1933.

The March to the Führer (Der Marsch zum Führer) is a Nazi propaganda film released in 1940. It depicts the nationwide march of Hitler Youth to Nuremberg and features the Königsplatz.

After the war the Königsplatz was restored to its pre-war appearance.

Transportation
The Königsplatz is served by a U-Bahn station of the same name.

Sport 
During the 2022 European Championships the Sports Climbing and Beach Volleyball events were held at Königsplatz

See also 
Nazi architecture

References

External links

Panorama Königsplatz – Interactive 360° Panorama
Alan Heath : Munich Königsplatz – film showing the site
Traces of Evil – Königsplatz during the Third Reich and today

Tourist attractions in Munich
Neoclassical architecture in Munich
Squares in Munich
Maxvorstadt